ABC Classic, formerly ABC-FM (also ABC Fine Music), and then ABC Classic FM, is an Australian classical music radio station available in Australia and internationally. Its website features classical music news, features and listening guides. It is operated by the Australian Broadcasting Corporation (ABC).

History
ABC Classic was established in 1976 as "ABC-FM", and later for a short time was known as "ABC Fine Music" (a play on the letters FM). It became known as ABC Classic FM in 1994, before adopting its current name in January 2019. It was the ABC's first experiment in FM broadcasting – which had become a necessity in Australia as broadcasters ran out of AM frequencies on which to transmit. This was before most commercial stations had started using FM, and the ABC was first to use satellite transmissions. The creation of ABC Classic FM was inspired partly by the example of BBC Radio 3, and its focus was on fine music and the arts.

ABC Classic FM's studios were established at the ABC studios in Collinswood, a suburb of Adelaide, South Australia. The ABC's decision to establish ABC Classic FM in Adelaide was significant because most of the ABC's radio and television national program original infrastructure was and is located in Sydney. However, staffing has been progressively cut over the years, from the starting base of 60 down to just five by 2015, a particularly savage round of cuts which included the loss of popular presenter Julia Lester when her job moved to the Sydney studios.

2019 rebrand 
On 24 November 2018, the ABC announced that ABC Classic FM would undergo a major rebrand in 2019, and change its name to ABC Classic.

Programming

ABC Classic broadcasts classical music, operas, recitals and live concerts. Former "Classic Breakfast" producer Greg Keane has been critical of changes that were made to programming methods in 2016. He says that the use of G-Selector software has led to a "loss of thoughtful, varied and original programming devised by experienced producers". Around half of the music played is performed by Australian musicians, and the ABC Young Performers Awards are a way of supporting a younger generation of musicians.

Live music is an important feature of the programming, and past concerts are available online afterwards. but has reduced over time owing to budget cuts.

Events
A number of special events are held throughout the year, including:

Classic 100 Countdowns

Since 2001, ABC Classic FM has organised a number of Classic 100 Countdown surveys. The results of each survey are decided by votes cast by the listeners of the radio station. The works are broadcast in reverse order of popularity over three days. The countdown culminates in the broadcast of a live concert featuring the most popular pieces and finishes with the number one listener choice. A feature of the countdown is that each piece is kept secret until just before its broadcast (including the pieces featured in the final concert).

Classic 100 themes have included Love, Beethoven, Music in the Movies, Composers, and Dance.

AusMusic Month
Each November on ABC Classic is AusMusic Month, where Australian artists are heavily promoted. This includes more Australian composition broadcast every day; some free, limited-entry concerts around the country; all-Australian albums of the week; and many live Australian concerts.

News
In common with all ABC Radio stations (other than Triple J, which operates its own service), it also carries news bulletins produced by ABC News. On 19 December 2005, in line with the policy applied at every ABC Radio network (except Triple J and Radio Australia), these news bulletins became state-based rather than national.

ABC Classic 2

ABC Classic 2, a music-only talk-free streaming station, was established in June 2014. Programmed by the ABC Classic team, it broadcasts only via an online stream and is available on the ABC's Android and iOS apps. Classic 2 specialises in streaming popular styles of classical music. The music on Classic 2 is performed exclusively by leading Australian orchestras, ensembles and soloists.

Limelight magazine

The monthly arts magazine Limelight was, under its former name ABC Radio 24 Hours (1976–2003), originally owned and published by the ABC. It is now independently owned and published, but continues a strong, albeit unofficial, affiliation with the ABC and with ABC Classic in particular.

See also 
Australian Broadcasting Corporation
Symphony Australia
BBC Radio 3

References

External links 
 

APRA Award winners
Australian radio networks
Classical music radio stations in Australia
Australian Broadcasting Corporation radio stations
Public radio in Australia